Henri Longchambon (27 July 1896 in Clermont-Ferrand, Puy-de-Dôme – 20 March 1969 in Le Kremlin-Bicêtre) was a French politician and scientist.

Early life
Henri Longchambon was born on 27 July 1896 in Clermont-Ferrand, France. His father, who worked at the University of Auvergne, died when he was thirteen years old.

Longmachon passed his Baccalaureate in Clermont-Ferrand. He served in the First World War from 1915 to 1918 and subsequently received the knighthood of the Legion of Honour. He graduated from the École Normale Supérieure and passed the agrégation in Physics in 1921. He received a PhD in Mineralogy from the University of Paris in 1925.

Career
Longchambon became an Assistant Professor at the University of Montpellier in 1925. He was appointed as the chair of the department of Applied and Theoretical Mineralogy at the University of Lyon in 1927. He succeeded Victor Grignard as Dean of its College of Sciences in 1936.

Longchambon was Minister for Supply from 26 January 1946 to 24 June 1946 in the government of Félix Gouin, and later Secretary of State for Scientific Research and Technical Progress (French: Secrétaire d'État Recherche scientifique et Progrès technique) from 19 June 1954 to 23 February 1955 in the government of Pierre Mendès-France. He was elected at the French Senate on 5 May 1959, was reelected on 4 October 1962 and remained a senator until his death.

Death
Longchambon died on 20 March 1969 in Le Kremlin-Bicêtre near Paris.

References

1896 births
1969 deaths
Scientists from Clermont-Ferrand
French military personnel of World War I
École Normale Supérieure alumni
University of Paris alumni
Academic staff of the University of Montpellier
Academic staff of the University of Lyon
French mineralogists
Radical Party (France) politicians
French Senators of the Fourth Republic
French Senators of the Fifth Republic
Chevaliers of the Légion d'honneur
Senators of French citizens living abroad
Politicians from Clermont-Ferrand